Sanatruces, Sinatruces (Grecized), Sanatruk, or Sanatruq (Aramaicized), may refer to:

Sanatruces of Parthia
Sanatruces II of Parthia
Sanatruk, Arsacid king of Armenia
Sanatruq I, king of Hatra
Sanatruq II, king of Hatra
Sanesan or Sanatruk, king of Maskut